The Hotel DeFair, at NE 2 and Main St. in Hyannis, Nebraska, and also known as the Hyannis Hotel, was built in 1898 and is listed on the National Register of Historic Places (NRHP).  According to its NRHP nomination, it once was considered to be the best hotel and restaurant in western Nebraska.

The building design includes Greek Revival and Second Empire architectural elements.

The hotel was listed on the National Register of Historic Places in 1976.

References

External links 
More photos of the Hotel DeFair at Wikimedia Commons

Hotel buildings on the National Register of Historic Places in Nebraska
Greek Revival architecture in Nebraska
Second Empire architecture in Nebraska
Hotel buildings completed in 1898
Buildings and structures in Grant County, Nebraska
1898 establishments in Nebraska
National Register of Historic Places in Grant County, Nebraska